Nativity Rocks! is a 2018 comedy film and the fourth and final instalment of the Nativity film series by Debbie Isitt. It stars Simon Lipkin, Celia Imrie, Craig Revel Horwood, Helen George, Ruth Jones & Daniel Boys and Dave Tooth. Like its predecessors, it was distributed by Entertainment One.

Plot
Doru, a child refugee from Syria, is separated from his father as he arrives in the United Kingdom. He is moved to Coventry by social worker Miss Shelly and joins St Bernadette's Primary School, where he meets new teaching assistant Jerry Poppy, who assists him in his search for his father, amid another Christmas musical production for the school, led by impresario Emmanuel Cavendish. Jerry Poppy is immediately suspicious that Cavendish and he have met before, believing that his mother used to clean Cavendish's parents' house before Cavendish framed Jerry for stealing a brooch.

With nowhere to stay, Jerry and Doru end up staying with Barnaby, a lonely boy with rich parents who are often away. After Jerry helps Barnaby decorate the house, he prompts Barnaby's mother Clara to start making more of an effort to be there for her son emotionally rather than just providing for him financially. Cavendish's auditions for the show initially go well, but when Cavendish starts trying to take all the major parts for himself, he is fired by the schools so they can do it themselves. Doru’s father goes looking for Doru, and after receiving £1 from a Shopkeeper, hitches a bus to Coventry.

In an after credit’s scene, it is revealed that The Shopkeeper set the whole thing up.

Cast
 Simon Lipkin as Jerry Poppy
 Craig Revel Horwood as Emmanuel Cavendish
 Brian Bartle as Doru
 Daniel Boys as Mr. Johnson
 Helen George as Miss Shelly
 Anna Chancellor as Sandra “Sandy” Hargreaves
 Hugh Dennis as Liam Hargreaves
 Ramin Karimloo as Doru's Dad
 Celia Imrie as Mrs. Keen
 Ruth Jones as Farmer Beatie
 Vincent Franklin as Lord Mayor
 Meera Syal as Nina
 Jessica Hynes as Angel Matthews
 Simon Lowe as Rory B. Bellows
 Jon Robyns
Dave Tooth as Shropshire shopkeeper

Reception
The film has a Rotten Tomatoes score of  based on  reviews.

When the film was released in the United Kingdom, it opened at #5, behind Fantastic Beasts: The Crimes of Grindelwald, The Grinch, Bohemian Rhapsody and Robin Hood.

See also
 2018 in film
 List of British films of 2018
 List of Christmas films

References

External links
 

2018 films
British Christmas comedy films
2010s Christmas comedy films
British sequel films
2018 comedy films
2010s English-language films
2010s British films